Kaklık  is a town in Honaz district of Denizli Province, Turkey.

Geography 
It is situated in the plain which is named Kaklık plain. It is on both the state highway  and the railroad. The population of Kaklık was 4,864 as of 2012.

History 
Kaklık is an old (14th century ?) settlement. The name of the settlement probably refers to partridges which are abundant around. In the 11th century, the settlement was a part of Seljuks of Turkey. After it was captured by the Crusades, it was returned to Seljuks in 1206. In 1423 it was incorporated into Ottoman Empire. After the First World War, during the partition of Turkey the settlement was offered to Italia, but it was occupied by Greek forces. After the Turkish War of Independence, the town was returned to Turkey. Following the construction of the highway in 1936, Kaklık flourished and in 1971 it was declared a seat of township.

Economy 
Situated in the fertile plain, the town's economy depends on agriculture. Cereal, cotton, sugar beet and anise are among the more important crops. Travertine mining is another profitable activity. Kaklık Cave, to the north of the town is a touristic cave.

References

Populated places in Denizli Province
Towns in Turkey
Honaz District